Elections to the United States House of Representatives in Florida were held November 3, 1896 for two seats in the 55th Congress.  These elections were held at the same time as the 1896 Presidential election and the election for Governor.

There were a total of five different parties running, including a short-lived breakaway faction of the Democratic Party known as the National Democratic Party.

Background
The previous two elections had involved only the Democratic and People's Parties.  The Republicans returned to Floridian congressional elections in this race, as did the Prohibition Party, which had last run a candidate for Congress in Florida in 1886.

Election results
Charles Merian Cooper (D) of the  did not run for renomination.

See also
United States House of Representatives elections, 1896

References

1896
Florida
United States House of Representatives